Łazy is a town in Silesian Voivodeship, southern Poland. The name is cultural in origin and commonly found in Slavic languages denoting an arable area obtained by slash-and-burn technique.

Łazy may also refer to the following places:

Gmina Łazy in Silesian Voivodeship (south Poland)
Łazy, Greater Poland Voivodeship (west-central Poland)
Łazy, Bochnia County in Lesser Poland Voivodeship (south Poland)
Łazy, Kraków County in Lesser Poland Voivodeship (south Poland)
Łazy, part of the Bieżanów-Prokocim district of Kraków
Łazy, Miechów County in Lesser Poland Voivodeship (south Poland)
Łazy, Oświęcim County in Lesser Poland Voivodeship (south Poland)
Łazy, Bełchatów County in Łódź Voivodeship (central Poland)
Łazy, Radomsko County in Łódź Voivodeship (central Poland)
Łazy, Lower Silesian Voivodeship (south-west Poland)
Łazy, Lublin Voivodeship (east Poland)
Łazy, Krosno County in Lubusz Voivodeship (west Poland)
Łazy, Żary County in Lubusz Voiovdeship (west Poland)
Łazy, Maków County in Masovian Voivodeship (east-central Poland)
Łazy, Ostrołęka County in Masovian Voivodeship (east-central Poland)
Łazy, Piaseczno County in Masovian Voivodeship (east-central Poland)
Łazy, Przasnysz County in Masovian Voivodeship (east-central Poland)
Łazy, Sierpc County in Masovian Voivodeship (east-central Poland)
Łazy, Szydłowiec County in Masovian Voivodeship (east-central Poland)
Łazy, Warsaw West County in Masovian Voivodeship (east-central Poland)
Łazy, Węgrów County in Masovian Voivodeship (east-central Poland)
Łazy, Żuromin County in Masovian Voivodeship (east-central Poland)
Łazy, Opole Voivodeship (south-west Poland)
Łazy, Podlaskie Voivodeship (north-east Poland)
Łazy, Bielsko County in Silesian Voivodeship (south Poland)
Łazy, Częstochowa County in Silesian Voivodeship (south Poland)
Łazy, Lubliniec County in Silesian Voivodeship (south Poland)
Łazy, Jarosław County in Subcarpathian Voivodeship (south-east Poland)
Łazy, Gmina Rymanów in Subcarpathian Voivodeship (south-east Poland)
Łazy, Koszalin County in West Pomeranian Voivodeship (north-west Poland)
Łazy, Myślibórz County in West Pomeranian Voivodeship (north-west Poland)
Lazy (Orlová), village, now part of the town of Orlová, Czech Republic

See also
Lazy (disambiguation)